The She'eb massacre was an act of mass murder committed against the Eritrean civilian population in She'eb during the Eritrean War of Independence by Ethiopian military forces during the spring of 1988, towards the end of the Ethiopian Civil War.

Massacre
The entire town was raised and burnt to the ground in 1988, and the people who had not been able to flee were ordered to assemble and subsequently run over with tanks while those trying to flee were shot. The massacre left about 400 people dead, including many elderly and children who had not been able to flee in advance. They proceeded to kill at least 100 more civilians in neighboring villages.

See also
List of massacres committed during the Eritrean War of Independence

References

Massacres in 1988
1988 in Eritrea
1988 in Ethiopia
20th-century mass murder in Africa
Massacres in Eritrea
Eritrean War of Independence
Massacres in Ethiopia
May 1998 crimes
May 1998 events in Africa
1998 murders in Africa